Máire Bradshaw (born 1943), is a writer, poet and publisher. Bradshaw was born in Limerick in 1943. She was educated in Laurel Hill convent before moving to Cork. There she got involved with the feminist movement. Bradshaw runs Bradshaw Books founded in 1985 as the Cork Women's Poetry Circle. She has published Theo Dorgan and Dympna Dreyer amongst others. Bradshaw is a poet and was commissioned in 1991 to write the poem to celebrate the freedom of the city of Cork given to Mary Robinson, the first female president of Ireland as well as reading the presidential poem during her inauguration. Her work is also in a number of anthologies as well as collections of her own work. Bradshaw is also the director of Tig Fili, an organisation designed to  provide workshops in art and poetry.

Bibliography
 Wise Women: A Portrait
 High Time for All the Marys
 Imagine: East Cork Writers
 Instinct

References and sources

1943 births
Living people
20th-century Irish poets
Irish women poets
Irish publishers (people)